Eagle Grove is a census-designated place and unincorporated community in Hart County, Georgia, United States. Its population was 139 as of the 2020 census. U.S. Route 29 passes through the community.

Demographics

References

Populated places in Hart County, Georgia
Census-designated places in Georgia (U.S. state)